Cascade Falls is a waterfall from the Cascade Creek, shortly before it empties in Alsea River, in Lincoln County, Oregon. Cascade Creek is known for being a point for fishing chinook salmon, bull trout, and steelhead trout.

See also 
 List of waterfalls in Oregon

References

Waterfalls of Lincoln County, Oregon